Hampton Bishop is a village and civil parish south-east of Hereford, in Herefordshire, England. The population of the civil parish at the 2011 Census was 505. The village itself is on a wedge between the River Wye and the River Lugg, not far from where the River Frome meets the Lugg.

The half-timbered 12th-century Anglican parish church is dedicated to St Andrew and is a Grade I listed building.

The local pub, the "Bunch of Carrots", is located in the centre of the village, on the B4224 road, next to a meander in the River Wye. According to David Rothwell's The Dictionary of Pub Names, the name is derived from a curiously shaped rock formation on the river, visible when the water level is low.

A pair of European bee-eaters made a nesting attempt here in 2005 (see Bee-eaters in Britain).

References

External links 

Hampton Bishop at genuki.org
Hampton Bishop Parish Council

Villages in Herefordshire